The Southern California Open currently known as The  San Diego Open is an ATP 250 and WTA 500 tournament held at the Barnes Tennis Centre in San Diego, California. The event originated as the Southern California Championships that ran from 1887 until 1978.

In August 2021, after the cancellation of the Asia Swing due to the COVID-19 pandemic, the Barnes Tennis Centre San Diego was allocated a two year 250 tournament license. Prior to that, it used to be a WTA only event which was last held as a WTA Challenger in 2015 at Carlsbad.

In 2021, positioned one week before the 1000 Indian Wells Masters and only a 2 hour 30 min drive from Indian Wells, the San Diego Open attracted a very strong line up of players including Denis Shapovalov, Andrey Rublev, Diego Schwartzman, Grigor Dimitrov and Andy Murray. With 8 of the top 20 players attending and the ranking cut off being 42 to get into the main draw it was the second most competitive ATP 250 all season since Doha.

Daniel Vallverdu took on the position of managing director, Ryan Redondo   was named the tournament director and Billie Jean King accepted the role of honorary tournament chair.

After beating Murray in the second round and Dimitrov in the semifinal, the 22 year old Norwegian Casper Ruud went on to win the final of the 2021 San Diego Open, beating Cameron Norrie 6-0, 6-2, and was handed the trophy by Rod Laver. It was Ruud’s fifth trophy of the season moving him up to world No. 8, having won already the titles Geneva Open, Swiss Open, Kitzbühel and Båstad.

ATP tournament history
The  San Diego Open is an ATP 250 tournament held at the Barnes Tennis Centre in San Diego, California. In August 2021, after the cancellation of the Asia Swing due to the COVID-19 pandemic, the Barnes Tennis Centre San Diego was allocated a one year 250 tournament license. Prior to that, it used to be a WTA event which was last held as a WTA Challenger in 2015 at Carlsbad.

Positioned one week before the Indian Wells Masters and only a 2 hour drive from Indian Wells, the San Diego Open attracted a very strong line up of players including Denis Shapovalov, Andrey Rublev, Kei Nishikori, Grigor Dimitrov and Andy Murray. With 8 of the top 20 players attending and the ranking cut off being 42 to get in the main draw it is the second most competitive ATP 250 all season since Doha.

Daniel Vallverdu took on the position of managing director, Ryan Redondo was named the tournament director and Billie Jean King accepted the role of honorary tournament chairman.

WTA tournament history
The event was formed in 1984 by Raquel Giscafré as the Ginny of San Diego. Prior to this there had been two previous women's tennis tournaments in San Diego: a Virginia Slims event in 1971 and the Wells Fargo Open, which ran from 1979 to 1982. Giscafre's former doubles partner, Jane Stratton, attained co-ownership of the tournament from 1986 until the event's cessation. The tournament has had various principal sponsors throughout its history, and has been played under the headings of the Great American Bank Classic, the Mazda Classic and the Toshiba Classic. The tournament was known for its strong player fields, location in the hills and atmosphere.

Although the tournament achieved Tier-I status only in 2004, it became a draw to the heavyweights in women's tennis since its inception in the 1980s, being a crucial warm-up tournament leading to the US Open. Past champions of the tournament include former world No.-1s Steffi Graf, Jennifer Capriati, Lindsay Davenport, Venus Williams, Martina Hingis, Justine Henin, and Maria Sharapova. Six players won the tournament more than once, four of them consecutively. Graf holds the record for most wins (4); Venus Williams holds the record for most consecutive titles (3).

The tournament's purse doubled to $200,000 in 1989, when the sponsor changed to San Diego-based Great American Bank from Virginia Slims, a cigarette brand owned by Philip Morris. The tournament moved from the San Diego Tennis & Racquet Club to the La Costa Resort and Spa in 1991, when the sponsor was changed to Mazda from Great American, which was in financial decline. On September 7, 2009, the Sony Ericsson WTA Tour announced the return of professional women's tennis to San Diego in 2010, under the sponsorship of Mercury Insurance. The Mercury Insurance Open was renamed the Southern California Open starting in 2013.

In 2014, the event was relocated to Tokyo, Japan.

The tournament became the Carlsbad Classic in 2015, hosted by the Park Hyatt Aviara Resort in Carlsbad, California, from November 23–29. As a WTA Challenger event, the Carlsbad Classic featured a 32-player singles main draw, an 8-player qualifying draw, and an 8-team doubles draw with $125,000 in prize money. It was the first WTA tournament held during Thanksgiving week.

Sponsor history:
 Virginia Slims of San Diego: 1971, 1985–1988
 Wells Fargo Open: 1979–1982
 Ginny of San Diego: 1984
 Great American Bank Classic: 1989–1990
 Mazda Classic: 1991–1993
 Toshiba Classic; 1994–1998
 TIG Classic: 1999
 Acura Classic: 2000–2007
 Mercury Insurance Open: 2010–2012
 Southern California Open: 2013
 GoMacro: 2015

Past finals

Men's singles

Women's singles

Prior tournaments in San Diego area

Subsequent and current organized event

Men's doubles

Women's doubles

Prior

Subsequent & current

See also
 1990 Great American Bank Classic
 List of tennis tournaments

References and footnotes

External links

 
Defunct tennis tournaments in the United States
Hard court tennis tournaments in the United States
WTA Tour
Virginia Slims tennis tournaments
Carlsbad, California
WTA 125 tournaments
Women's tennis tournaments in the United States
Women's sports in California
Sports competitions in San Diego County, California